Syngamia violata is a moth in the family Crambidae. It was described by Johan Christian Fabricius in 1787. It is found in Tamil Nadu, India.

References

Moths described in 1787
Spilomelinae